Aarya Ambekar is a Marathi playback singer and actor from Pune, Maharashtra. She participated and reached the finals of the first season of Sa Re Ga Ma Pa Marathi L'il Champs aired on Zee Marathi channel between July 2008 and February 2009. Aarya has made her acting debut in January 2017 through the film Ti Saddhya Kay Karte.

Personal life
Aarya is the daughter of Samir Ambekar and Shruti Ambekar. Shruti Ambekar is a classical vocalist of Jaipur Gharana whereas Samir is a doctor by profession. Aarya holds a Bachelor of Arts, BA, degree with a major in economics. She holds a Master of Arts, MA, degree in music. She ranked first in the university for her MA examination and earned a gold medal. She has completed a certificate course in Sound Engineering.

Background
Aarya's grandmother, a classical vocalist, recognized the talent in Aarya when Aarya was two years old. Aarya started her formal musical training at the age of five and half years from her Guru and mother, Shruti Ambekar. At the age of six, when she was in the first standard, Aarya gave her first music performance.

She got selected in Sa Re Ga Ma Pa Lil' Champs, a reality TV music competition in 2008 and went on to become a finalist.

Career

Sa Re Ga Ma Pa Marathi L'il Champs
In 2008, Aarya was auditioned for the debut season of Sa Re Ga Ma Pa Marathi L'il Champs, a competitive music reality show organized by the Zee Marathi television channel. She was one of the final 50 who were selected from amongst several thousand children aged between 8 and 14 across Maharashtra. She made her way to the top 10 finalists and then to the Final 5 Mega-Finalists.

Aarya was popularly referred to as the "Pretty Young Girl", during the show.

Aarya sang a wide variety of songs in the competition. She created the record of receiving full marks from the judges many times. Aarya created an unbeatable record when she got  वरचा नी (equivalent to 200%), for her beautifully sung "Paan Khae Saiyyan Hamaro", which remains unbroken in all the nine Schedules of SA RE GA MA PA and even after two schedules of SA RE GA MA PA for professional singers. Singer Hariharan was the celebrity judge for that episode.

Aarya was also awarded performer of the week in numerous episodes by eminent singing personalities like Mahalaxmi Iyer, Shreya Ghoshal, Hariharan etc. Aarya sings a wide variety of songs ranging from pure classical songs, Natyageet, Bhavgeet, Bhaktigeet to Marathi Chitrapat Sangeet, Hindi songs, folk songs, Lavanis as well.

She sang "Aye Mere Watan Ke Logo" to pay tribute to those who died in the 2008 Mumbai attacks on 26 November 2008. She also performed the same song at Shivaji Park, Dadar in a program organised by Mumbai Police to pay tribute to the martyrs who laid down their lives fighting the terrorists in that attack. The song was originally sung by Lata Mangeshkar after the 1962 India-China War.

During the course of the program, Aarya was also awarded the Manik Varma Scholarship. She is the youngest singer to win the scholarship.

Sa Re Ga Ma Pa Marathi L'il Champs Season 3
Aarya along with other finalists of the first season returned to the singing reality show 12 years after the debut season as a judge on the show.

Singing

Albums
 Pancha Ratna Vol. 1, 2, 3 on Universal Music India
 Garjati Sahyadriche Kade
 Jai Hari Vitthal
 Marathi Abhimaangeet composed by Kaushal Inamdar
 Aathava Swar composed by Mrs. Varsha Bhave
 Mala Mhanatyat Aarya Ambekar
 Geet Tujhe Gata Gata – Collections of poems of famous poets
 Khaucha Gaav composed by Yashwant Deo
 Hum Aur Tum – Hindi songs album composed by Khalil Abhyankar
 Aanandwan Ale Ghari  – Shri Baba Amte
 Majhya Matiche Gayan – Kusumagraj Pratishthan
 Diva Lagu De Re Deva – First solo album based on poems of eminent Marathi poets. The album is composed by famous composer Saleel Kulkarni
 Door Chandanyanchya Gaava – composer, Neeraj; lyrics, Dr Kshama Valsangkar

Marathi films

TV serials 
Suvasini – a Marathi daily soap telecast on Star Pravah channel from 14 November 2011.
Dil Dosti Duniyadari – a Marathi sitcom telecast on Zee Marathi channel from 9 March 2015.
Tula Pahate Re – a Marathi daily soap telecast on Zee Marathi channel from 13 August 2018. 
Jeevlaga – a Marathi daily soap telecast on Star Pravah in 2019.
Aai Kuthe Kay Karte! – a Marathi daily soap telecast on Star Pravah channel from 23 December 2019.
 Aggabai Sasubai – a Marathi daily soap telecast on Zee Marathi channel from 22 July 2019. Aarya sang the theme song Rang Punha Ala.
 Majha Hoshil Na – a Marathi daily soap telecast on Zee Marathi channel from 2 March 2020.
 Tujha Majha Jamtay - a Marathi daily soap telecast on Zee Yuva. Aarya sang the title song with her co-singer Abhay Jodhpurkar.
 Man Udu Udu Zhala - a Marathi daily soap telecast on Zee Marathi from 30 August 2021. Aarya sang the title song with her co-singer Avadhoot Gupte. Saleel Kulkarni has composed the song.
 Yeu Kashi Tashi Me Nandayla - a Marathi daily soap telecast on Zee Marathi from 4 January 2021. Aarya sang the theme song, Mann Bawarle with her co-singer Rohit Raut.
 Tuzech Mi Geet Gaat Aahe - a Marathi daily soap telecast on Star Pravah from 2 May 2022. Aarya sang the title song composed by Avadhoot Gupte

Acting

Public Appearances
A few events where Aarya has performed – 
 Vasantotsav 2008 – Musical concert arranged in Pune every year by Rahul Deshpande in memory of his legendary grandfather Vasantrao Deshpande
 Shrimant Dagadusheth Halwai Ganapati Music Festival 2009, 2010.
 Little Champs live shows in many cities like Mumbai, Pune, Nashik Sangli, Aurangabad, Goa, Ratnagiri, Thane, Nagpur, Wardha, Bhopal etc. and at international venues like Dubai, Abu Dhabi. These are runaway popular shows where Aarya performs with four other Little Champs Mugdha Vaishampayan, Prathamesh Laghate, Rohit Raut and Kartiki Gaikwad in perfect sync. This group is known as 'Panch-Ratna'.
 Live performance in the devotional programme arranged in the presence of Sathya Sai Baba in Sai Ashram at village Hadshi, near Pune in October 2009
 Live performance in the special programme arranged on the occasion of birthday of Sathya Sai Baba in Sai Ashram at Puttaparthi. November 2009
 Live performance in Swar Asha program arranged to felicitate Asha Bhosale in Pune in March 2010. Aarya sang duets with Sudesh Bhonsle in this program. The program was aired on Mi Marathi Channel.
 Live performance at a function organised by Deccan Education Society to mark its 125th year of existence. Aarya performed in front of The Honourable President of India, Her Excellency Pratibha Patil.
 Live performance along with Lata Mangeshkar in special function organised by Shiv Sena on occasion of the Golden Jubilee Year of Maharashtra State on Maharashtra Day.
 Antarnaad – a program consisting of compositions by Shrinivas Khale. The program was aired on Mi Marathi Channel on 29 August 2010.
 As a celebrity guest in Ashtavinayak Darshan along with Prathamesh Laghate. Ashtavinayak Darshan program consists visits to the eight holy temples of Lord Ganesha (Ashtavinayaka) situated around Pune district. This program was telecast on Star Majha news channel during the Ganpati Festival 2010 from 11–18 September 2010.
 Live performance in Nashik Festival 2011
 Bheeti Laagi Jeeva 2010, 2011 – a special show on yearly pilgrimage from Alandi to Pandharpur telecast on IBN Lokmat.
 Maharashtra Mandal Dubai (MPFS) 2017 – As a part of Waarsa Suraancha
 TEDxVIT 2021

Awards and recognition
 2008 – Youngest to be awarded the "Manik Varma Scholarship" towards her future music studies
 2009 – Runner-up of the Sa Re Ga Ma Pa Marathi L'il Champs reality-based music competition organised by Zee Marathi
 2009 – Maharashtra Shasan Puraskar
 2010 – Haribhau Sane Award
2010 – Punyaratna – YuvaGaurav Award
 2011 – Big Marathi Rising Star Award (Music)
 2012 – Young Achievers Award – awarded by Whistling Woods International
 2012 – Dr. Vasantrao Deshpande Puraskar
 2014 – Aarya Puraskar
 2015 – Dr. Usha Atre Award by Swaranand Pratisthan
 2016 – Vidya Pradnya Puraskar by Ga.Di.Ma. Pratisthan
 2017 – Godrej Fresh Face of the Year – Sahyadri Navaratna Awards 
 2018 – Best Female Singer and Best Acting Debut – Female for Ti Saddhya Kay Karte - Maharashtracha Favourite Kon by Zee Talkies
 2018 – Most Natural Performance of the Year for Ti Sadhya Kay Karate – Zee Chitra Gaurav 
 2018 – Best Female Singer and Best Acting Debut – Female for Ti Sadhya Kay Karate – City Cine Awards Marathi by Radio City
 2019 – Sur Jytosna National Music Award 
 2021 - Best Female Singer of the Decade for the song, 'Hrudayat Vaje Something' from the 2017 movie 'Ti Sadhya Kay Karate' - Maharashtracha Favorite Kon? (महाराष्ट्राचा फेव्हरेट कोण - सर्वोत्कृष्ट गायिका)
 2022 – Best Playback Singer Female for "Bai Ga" from Chandramukhi – Fakt Marathi Cine Sanman

References

External links
 Aarya's Official Facebook Page
 Aarya's Official Youtube Channel
 Aarya's profile on SAREGAMA site
 

Living people
Marathi playback singers
Singers from Mumbai
Women musicians from Maharashtra
Marathi-language singers
21st-century Indian women singers
21st-century Indian singers
Year of birth missing (living people)